Zajelše is a settlement north of Dol pri Ljubljani in the southeastern part of the Upper Carniola region of Slovenia.

References

External links

Zajelše on Geopedia

Populated places in the Municipality of Dol pri Ljubljani